Wakeman Brook is a river in Delaware County, New York. It flows into the West Branch Delaware River southwest of Walton. It was formally called "Johnnie Brook".

References

Rivers of New York (state)
Rivers of Delaware County, New York